Jana Michailidu (born 18 October 1990) is a Czech politician of Greek origin. From June to August 2014 she was acting chairwoman of the Czech Pirate Party. She is currently a member of the party's Republic Committee.

In January 2022 she ran for the leadership of the Czech Pirate Party, finishing fourth.

Early life
Jana Michailidu was born in Karviná, in the north-east of the present-day Czech Republic. She is descended from Greeks who emigrated to Czechoslovakia after the fall of the Democratic Army of Greece in the Greek Civil War. She studied drug biotechnology at the University of Chemistry and Technology in Prague.

Political career
Michailidu ran unsuccessfully for the Czech Pirate Party in the 2013 Czech legislative election. In 2014, she participated in the leadership of the Young Pirates of Europe. Michailidu described herself as a "democratic communist".

References

External links
 Jana Michailidu on Czech Pirate Party wiki

1990 births
Living people
People from Karviná
21st-century Czech women politicians
Czech Pirate Party politicians
Czech people of Greek descent
Czech socialists
University of Chemistry and Technology, Prague alumni
Czech communists